Hal Cooper may refer to:

Hal Cooper (director) (1923–2014), American television director and producer
Hal Cooper (ice hockey) (1913–1977), Canadian ice hockey player
Hal Cooper (American football), American football player
Hal Cooper (Archie Comics), a fictional character in Archie Comics